The 1869 Texas gubernatorial election was held to elect the Governor of Texas. Incumbent Governor Elisha M. Pease, who had been appointed by military governor Philip Sheridan, did not run for re-election. Edmund J. Davis defeated former Governor Andrew J. Hamilton narrowly.

This was the last election for Governor of Texas won by the Republican Party until 1978; both candidates were nominally members of the Party, with Hamilton being a Unionist and former Democrat and Davis being a Radical Republican.

Results

References

1869
Texas
1869 Texas elections